Kevin Davis may refer to:
Kevin Davis (rugby union)  (born 1986), rugby union player
 Kevin Davis (gymnast) (born 1966), American Olympic gymnast
 Kevin Davis (politician), mayor of Brantford, Ontario
 Kevin Davis (ATWT), a character in the US television soap opera As The World Turns
 Kevin Davis (author), author of The Brain Defense, see Helen S. Mayberg
 Kevin Davis, Blue Angels pilot killed in the 2007 Blue Angels South Carolina crash
 Kevin Davis, engineer in the recording industry (see 46th Grammy Awards)
 Colonel Kevin A. Davis, pleaded guilty to taking bribes, see Cockerham bribery case

See also
Kevin Davies (disambiguation)